Los Ranchos is a census-designated place in San Luis Obispo County, California. The 2010 United States census reported Los Ranchos's population was 1,477.

Los Ranchos is an area of residential subdivisions surrounding the San Luis Obispo Country Club. It is located between the San Luis Obispo County Regional Airport and Edna, California.

Geography
According to the United States Census Bureau, the CDP covers an area of 2.8 square miles (7.3 km2), 99.88% of it land and 0.12% of it water.

Demographics
The 2010 United States Census reported that Los Ranchos had a population of 1,477. The racial makeup of Los Ranchos was 1,389 (94.0%) White, 1 (0.1%) African American, 2 (0.1%) Native American, 31 (2.1%) Asian, 0 (0.0%) Pacific Islander, 18 (1.2%) from other races, and 36 (2.4%) from two or more races. Hispanic or Latino of any race were 58 persons (3.9%).

The Census reported that 1,477 people (100% of the population) lived in households, 0 (0%) lived in non-institutionalized group quarters, and 0 (0%) were institutionalized.

There were 583 households, out of which 164 (28.1%) had children under the age of 18 living in them, 422 (72.4%) were opposite-sex married couples living together, 27 (4.6%) had a female householder with no husband present, 16 (2.7%) had a male householder with no wife present.  There were 12 (2.1%) unmarried opposite-sex partnerships, and 5 (0.9%) same-sex married couples or partnerships. 99 households (17.0%) were made up of individuals, and 56 (9.6%) had someone living alone who was 65 years of age or older. The average household size was 2.53.  There were 465 families (79.8% of all households); the average family size was 2.80.

The population was spread out, with 313 people (21.2%) under the age of 18, 75 people (5.1%) aged 18 to 24, 187 people (12.7%) aged 25 to 44, 546 people (37.0%) aged 45 to 64, and 356 people (24.1%) who were 65 years of age or older.  The median age was 51.9 years. For every 100 females, there were 101.8 males.  For every 100 females age 18 and over, there were 97.3 males.

The homeowner vacancy rate was 1.1%; the rental vacancy rate was 0%.  1,314 people (89.0% of the population) lived in owner-occupied housing units and 163 people (11.0%) lived in rental housing units.

References

External links
San Luis Obispo Country Club

Census-designated places in San Luis Obispo County, California
Census-designated places in California